Fu Biao (September 27, 1963 – August 30, 2005) was a Chinese actor.

Biography
Fu Biao was born in the family of an army officer on September 27, 1963, in Beijing. After graduating from high school, he entered a film academy in Beijing to learn acting. As a film actor, he acted for the first time in the Shanghai Triad (摇呀摇,摇到外婆桥). From 1997 he acted in several New Year films directed by Feng Xiaogang and became a recognizable actor. He died from liver cancer after having his liver transplanted twice

Fu's funeral was attended by some of the biggest names in Chinese entertainment, including Zhang Yimou, Feng Xiaogang, Xu Fan, Sun Haiying, Lü Liping, Xu Zheng, Tao Hong, Zhang Guoli, Deng Jie, Feng Gong, Han Hong, Liu Zhenyun, Cai Ming, Yu Quan, Hou Yaowen, Alex Man, Zhang Jizhong, Liu Xiao Ling Tong, etc.

Personal life
Fu Biao married actress Zhang Qiufang (张秋芳) in 1989. They portrayed a married couple in several films, including The Dream Factory (1997), Rhapsody of Spring (1998), Happy Times (2000), and several TV series, including Promise of Fate (2002) and Wife (2003) which they co-starred. Zhang Qiufang also had a cameo role in Sorry Baby (1999). In 2006, Zhang published a memoir Yin Ji (印记; "Mark") about her marriage with Fu. The book also included some of Fu's writing after his cancer diagnosis, as well as commemorative essays by family members and some of their celebrity friends.

Fu Biao's son Fu Zi'en (傅子恩), born in 1991, graduated from Beijing Film Academy's Directing Institute.

Filmography

Film

TV dramas and sitcoms

Awards and nominations

References

External links

1963 births
2005 deaths
Deaths from liver cancer
Male actors from Beijing
Deaths from cancer in the People's Republic of China
Chinese male film actors
Chinese male television actors
Chinese male stage actors
20th-century Chinese male actors
21st-century Chinese male actors